Ted Schroeder defeated Frank Parker 8–6, 7–5, 3–6, 4–6, 6–2 in the final to win the men's singles tennis title at the 1942 U.S. National Championships.

Seeds
The seeded players are listed below. Ted Schroeder is the champion; others show the round in which they were eliminated.

  Ted Schroeder (champion)
  Pancho Segura (semifinals)
  Frank Parker (finalist)
  Ladislav Hecht (third round)
  Gardnar Mulloy (semifinals)
  Alejo Russell (quarterfinals)
  Bill Talbert (quarterfinals)
 n/a
  Sidney Wood (third round)
  Seymour Greenberg (quarterfinals)
  Harris Everett (third round)
  George Richards (quarterfinals)

Draw

Key
 Q = Qualifier
 WC = Wild card
 LL = Lucky loser
 r = Retired

Final eight

Earlier rounds

Section 1

Section 2

Section 3

Section 4

References

External links
 1942 U.S. National Championships on ITFtennis.com, the source for this draw

Men's Singles
1942